Necktie Second is the debut album by Pete Droge.

Critical reception
Trouser Press praised the album, writing that "Droge tips a retrospective nod to ’70s boy-rock on Necktie Second, updating the genre with a bit of humor on 'If You Don’t Love Me (I’ll Kill Myself)' and reviving the decade’s songwriting heyday with the slick folk-pop of 'Northern Bound Train.'”

Track listing
"If You Don't Love Me (I'll Kill Myself)" – 3:34
"Northern Bound Train" – 4:38
"Straylin Street" – 4:40
"Fourth of July" – 6:04
"Faith in You" – 5:32
"Two Steppin Monkey" – 4:31
"Sunspot Stopwatch" – 4:21
"Hardest Thing to Do" – 5:27
"So I Am Over You" – 4:55
"Dog on a Chain" – 4:33
"Hampton Inn Room 306" – 3:27

References

1994 debut albums
Albums produced by Brendan O'Brien (record producer)
American Recordings (record label) albums
Pete Droge albums